Lalaina Rabenarivo (born 8 August 1978) is a Malagasy amateur boxer. He represented his country in the light flyweight class at the 2004 Summer Olympics. He lost his initial bout against South Korean boxer Hong Moo-won.

References

Living people
1978 births
Malagasy male boxers
Olympic boxers of Madagascar
Boxers at the 2004 Summer Olympics
Competitors at the 2007 All-Africa Games
Light-flyweight boxers